Tabalus the Persian was the first Persian satrap of Sardis. Cyrus the Great of Persia put him in place after conquering Lydia and annexing it into the Persian Empire in 546 BC. Herodotus mentions him in his histories (Hdt 1. 153-4):

This was the same Tabalus whom Pactyes the Lydian trapped in the acropolis when he revolted and marched upon Sardis later that year:

External links
Herodotus.  The Histories of Herodotus.

Year of birth unknown
Year of death unknown
6th-century BC Iranian people
Achaemenid satraps of Lydia
Officials of Cyrus the Great

References